The FIBA AmeriCup Most Valuable Player is a FIBA award that is given every four years (previously every two years), to the Most Valuable Player of the FIBA AmeriCup tournament.

Winners

References

External links
FIBA Americas official website

Most Valuable Player
Basketball trophies and awards